Panhellenic Games is the collective term for four separate sports festivals held in ancient Greece. The four Games were:

Description

The Olympiad was one of the ways the Greeks measured time. The Olympic Games were used as a starting point, year one of the cycle; the Nemean and Isthmian Games were both held (in different months) in year two, followed by the Pythian Games in year three, and then the Nemean and Isthmian Games again in year four. The cycle then repeated itself with the Olympic Games. They were structured this way so that individual athletes could participate in all of the games. (Note that the dial on the Antikythera mechanism seems to show that the Nemean and Isthmian Games did not occur in the same years.)

Participants could come from all over the Greek world, including the various Greek colonies from Asia Minor to Iberia. However, participants probably had to be fairly wealthy in order to pay for training, transportation, lodging, and other expenses. Neither women nor non-Greeks were allowed to participate, except for very occasional later exceptions, such as the Roman emperor Nero. 

The main events at each of the games were chariot racing, wrestling, boxing, pankration, stadion and various other foot races, and the pentathlon (made up of wrestling, stadion, long jump, javelin throw, and discus throw). Except for the chariot race, all the events were performed nude.

The Olympic Games were the oldest of the four, said to have begun in 776 BC. It is more likely though that they were founded sometime in the late 7th century BC. They lasted until the Roman Emperor Theodosius, a Christian, abolished them as heathen in AD 393. The Pythian, Nemean, and Isthmian games most likely began sometime in the first or second quarter of the 6th century BC. The Isthmian games were held at the temple to Poseidon on the Isthmus of Corinth.

The games are also known as the stephanitic games (derived from stephanos the Attic Greek word for crown), because winners received only a garland for victory. No financial or material prizes were awarded, unlike at other ancient Greek athletic or artistic contests, such as the Panathenaic Games, at which winners were awarded many amphorae of first-class Athenian olive-oil. The Olympic games awarded a garland of olive leaves; the Pythian games, a garland of laurel leaves; the Nemean games, a crown of wild celery, and the Isthmian games, a garland of pine leaves in the archaic period, one of dried celery in the Classical and Hellenistic periods, and again one of pine from then on. Though victors received no material awards at the games, they were often showered with gifts and honours on returning to their polis.

See also
Agonothetes
Theorodokoi
Theoroi

Notes 

 
Games panhellenic